Geneviève Fioraso (born 10 October 1954) is a French politician, representative of the first district of Isère from June 2007 to June 2017, and a member of the Socialist Party. On 16 May 2012 she was appointed Minister for Higher Education and Research in the French government of Jean-Marc Ayrault.

Since 2008 she has been deputy for the Economy, Universities and Research for the City Council of Grenoble. During her previous term she was Deputy assistant for the Economy, Innovation, Trade and Craft, and First Vice-President of Metro -Agglomeration community of the Grenoble Alpes Métropole-, in charge of economic development.
Since 2003, she has been the CEO of the S.E.M. Minatec Entreprises (public-private venture, entrusted with the marketing of high-tech building of Minatec). She also serves as Chair of the Institut d'Administration des Entreprises Grenoble, Business Administration Institute of Grenoble.

Origin, and Training

Born in Amiens in 1954, the youngest of six children, Fioraso obtained her high-school diploma Baccalauréat at the age of 16 years and married at 18.
A student of Hypo-Khâgne, she continued her studies and obtained a master's degree in English, then worked as an English teacher in Amiens.
In 1978 she left teaching and moved to Grenoble, where she served first as Information Officer, then managing Documentation and Press for the City of Grenoble, where she began collaborating with Hubert Dubedout, city's mayor and MP, and became his parliamentary attaché in 1983.

Professional and political curriculum

In 1985 she participated in the cantonal electoral campaign, alongside Michel Destot.
From 1989 to 1995, she was part of the management team of Corys, a startups of the CEA.
Once he was elected mayor of Grenoble in 1995, Michel Destot requested that she serve as his Chief of Staff, for which she followed the economy and innovation affairs in particular.
From 1999 to 2001, Fioraso was director of the Agence Régionale du Numérique, a regional agency set up by the digital network of cities of the Rhône-Alpes region. From 2001 to 2004, she was a senior marketing manager at France Telecom, in charge of emerging markets in the social-health sector.
In 2007, Genevieve Fioraso won 63.03% of the vote and defeated Alain Carignon to be elected députée -member of the French Parliament- in Isère's 1st constituency.
At the National Assembly, she was a board member of the Socialist, Radical, Citizen and various left group; member of the Committee on Economic Affairs , the Environment and Territory; and member of the Parliamentary Office for the Evaluation of Scientific and Technological Choices (OPECST, Office parlementaire d'évaluation des choix scientifiques et technologiques).

She did not contest the 2017 French legislative election.

External links
 her job in Grenoble (French) from: grenoble.indymedia.org 
 Fioraso Genevieve Blog.
 Magazine Article in Acteurs de l'économie
 Official page on the site of the National Assembly

References

1954 births
Living people
Socialist Party (France) politicians
Women members of the National Assembly (France)
French people of Italian descent
People from Amiens
Politicians from Hauts-de-France
Deputies of the 13th National Assembly of the French Fifth Republic
21st-century French women politicians
Women government ministers of France